Holly Tucker (born December 22, 1992) is an American country music singer and multi-instrumentalist from Lorena, Texas who starred on Season 4 of television series The Voice.

Tucker is a Waco, Texas native, where she also resides.

Discography

Studio albums 
 It's About Time (2007)
 Love Is What She Likes (2011)
 Steel (2016)
 Welcome to Waco (2018)

EPs 
 Something to Be Said (2012)

Demos 
 For You (2009)

Singles 
 "Wax Paper Cups" (feat. Ray Johnston) (2016)

Singles from The Voice

References 

American women country singers
American country singer-songwriters
American women singer-songwriters
Living people
1993 births
The Voice (franchise) contestants
People from Lorena, Texas
People from Waco, Texas
21st-century American women singers
Country musicians from Texas
21st-century American singers
Singer-songwriters from Texas